All Eyez on Us is a collaborative studio album by American rappers Lil' Flip and Young Noble. It was released on March 4, 2008 via Real Talk Entertainment. Production was handled by Beat Killaz (Big Hollis and Preach), Vince V. and Real Talk Ent. with Derrick "Sac" Johnson served as executive producer. It features the lone guest appearance from Gudda Gudda. The album debuted at number 137 on the U.S. Billboard 200 chart, selling about 5,400 units during its first week. The title is a homage to 2Pac's 1996 album All Eyez on Me.

Track listing

Personnel
Wesley Eric Weston – rap vocals (tracks: 1-12, 14)
Rufus Cooper III – rap vocals (tracks: 2-5, 7-8, 10-13)
Carl Lilly – rap vocals (track 2)
Walter Hollis – producer (tracks: 1-3, 5, 7-8, 13-14)
Preach – producer (tracks: 1-3, 5, 7-8, 13-14)
Vince V. – producer (tracks: 4, 10-12)
Real Talk Ent. – producer (tracks: 6, 9)
Derrick Johnson – executive producer
James "Buck 3000" Olowokere – mixing
Ken Lee – mastering
Sintek Design – artwork

Charts

References

External links

2008 albums
Lil' Flip albums
Young Noble albums
Collaborative albums
Albums produced by Big Hollis
Real Talk Entertainment albums